Gino Ferrin (born 15 March 1947 in Berlin) is a German retired football manager and player.

Ferrin made a total of ten appearances in the Bundesliga during his career for Tennis Borussia Berlin and FC St. Pauli; he also played in a further 72 2. Bundesliga games.

References

External links 
 

1947 births
Living people
Footballers from Berlin
German footballers
Association football defenders
Association football midfielders
Bundesliga players
2. Bundesliga players
Tennis Borussia Berlin players
FC St. Pauli players
German football managers
20th-century German people